The 2020–21 season was Sunderland's 142nd season in their history and the third consecutive season in EFL League One. Along with League One, the club also participated in the FA Cup, EFL Cup and EFL Trophy. The season covered the period from 1 July 2020 to 30 June 2021.

The club finished fourth in the league and would miss out on promotion after losing 3–2 on aggregate to Lincoln City in the play-off semi final. They were winners of the EFL Trophy, beating Tranmere Rovers 1–0 in the final, in the club's first win at Wembley since 1973.

First team squad

Transfers

Transfers in

Loans in

Loans out

Transfers out

Pre-season friendlies

Competitions

EFL League One

League table

Results summary

Results by matchday

Matches

The 2020–21 season fixtures were released on 21 August.

Play-offs

FA Cup

The draw for the first round was made on Monday 26, October.

EFL Cup

The first round draw was made on 18 August, live on Sky Sports, by Paul Merson.

EFL Trophy

The regional group stage draw was confirmed on 18 August. The second round draw was made by Matt Murray on 20 November, at St Andrew’s. The third round draw was made on 10 December 2020 by Jon Parkin. The Quarter Final draw was made on 23 January 2021 by Sam Parkin. The Semi Final draw was made on 5 February 2021 by Adebayo Akinfenwa.

Appearances and goals
 

|-
|}

References

Sunderland
Sunderland A.F.C. seasons